Joan Ann Maynard is a British actress who has worked both on stage and on television. Her most notable roles are as Avice in the 1975 series Within These Walls and as Beverley in the Channel Four television comedy show Desmond's, which ran from 1989 to 1994. She has also been involved with producing black theatre, having been artistic director of the Black Theatre Co-operative and chair of the Black Theatre Forum.

Background
Brought up from the age of nine in east London, she went to St Angela's Ursuline Convent School, Upton Park, and subsequently studied at the Central School of Speech and Drama. Formerly Artistic Director of the Black Theatre Co-operative (now NitroBeat),  Maynard now works as the head of the arts subjects in Chiswick School, London.

References

External links
 Joan Ann Maynard at IMDb.

British actresses
Living people
Year of birth missing (living people)